Phyllomacromia sylvatica is a species of dragonfly in the family Corduliidae. It is found in Kenya, Tanzania, and Uganda. Its natural habitats are subtropical or tropical moist lowland forests and rivers. It is threatened by habitat loss.

References

Corduliidae
Taxonomy articles created by Polbot